Wayne Duncan Evans (born 25 August 1971) is a Welsh retired professional footballer who played as a defender for Walsall and Rochdale in the Football League. He later went on to coach youth kids, one club being Penn Fusion Soccer Academy in West Chester, PA. He only stayed for one season, later moving to Nova Scotia to continue his coaching career.

He worked as Youth Team manager at Shrewsbury Town alongside former Salop defenders Peter Wilding and David Hughes.

In 2011, he agreed to pull on his boots again and was named in Newtown squad for the New Year's Day trip to Welsh Premier League champions The New Saints.

Honours
Walsall
Football League Third Division runner-up: 1994–95

References

External links

1971 births
Living people
Welsh footballers
Association football defenders
Welshpool Town F.C. players
Walsall F.C. players
Rochdale A.F.C. players
Kidderminster Harriers F.C. players
English Football League players
Shrewsbury Town F.C. non-playing staff